Soundtrack to Human Motion is the debut album led by American pianist and composer Jason Moran which was recorded in 1998 and released on the Blue Note label the following year.

Reception

The AllMusic retrospective review by Heather Phares called it an "impressive first album" stating "Jazz pianist/composer Jason Moran's debut, Soundtrack to Human Motion, approaches his music with an abstract, impressionistic outlook".

All About Jazz reviewer David Adler said, "Can we all just agree that this is the debut of the year, if not the record of the year? Jazz has seen its share of excellent young players, but 24-year-old pianist Jason Moran really raises the bar with his superb Soundtrack to Human Motion ... Watch this man closely and see what develops".

In JazzTimes, Duck Baker wrote "Moran has plenty of pianistic ideas, and repeated listens reveal how he is moving into his own way of dealing. ... This is good music that can only get better if Moran stays his course".

Track listing
All compositions by Jason Moran except where noted
 "Gangsterism on Canvas" – 4:37
 "Snake Stance" – 4:41
 "Le Tombeau de Couperin / States of Art" (Maurice Ravel, Jason Moran) – 5:23
 "Still Moving" – 5:56
 "JAMO Meets SAMO" – 5:35
 "Kinesics" – 3:04
 "Aquanaut" – 6:22
 "Retrograde" – 6:25
 "Release from Suffering" – 5:15
 "Root Progression" – 5:22

Personnel
 Jason Moran – piano
 Greg Osby – alto saxophone, soprano saxophone
 Stefon Harris – vibraphone
 Lonnie Plaxico – bass
 Eric Harland – drums

References

1999 debut albums
Jason Moran (musician) albums
Blue Note Records albums